John Alexander Goschen, 3rd Viscount Goschen   (7 July 1906 – 22 March 1977), was a British Conservative politician.

Goschen was the second son of the Hon. Sir William Henry Goschen, second son of George Goschen, 1st Viscount Goschen, and was educated at Eton College and Sandhurst. He was a Colonel in the Grenadier Guards and served with the British Military Mission to Greece from 1945 to 1947. He was appointed an Officer of the Order of the British Empire for his military service in 1944. He succeeded his uncle to the viscountcy in 1952 and took his seat on the Conservative benches in the House of Lords. He served under Harold Macmillan, Sir Alec Douglas-Home and Edward Heath as Captain of the Yeomen of the Guard (Deputy Chief Whip in the House of Lords) from 1962 to 1964 and from 1970 to 1971. In 1972 he was appointed a Knight Commander of the Order of the British Empire for his political and public service.

Lord Goschen married firstly Hilda Violet Ursula Jervis, daughter of Colonel the Hon. St Leger Henry Jervis and granddaughter of the third Viscount St Vincent, in 1934. They were divorced in 1943. He married secondly Alvin England, daughter of H. England, in 1955. They had one son and one daughter. Lord Goschen died in March 1977, aged 70, and was succeeded by his only son Giles.

References

1906 births
1977 deaths
Conservative Party (UK) Baronesses- and Lords-in-Waiting
Grenadier Guards officers
Knights Commander of the Order of the British Empire
People educated at Eton College
Graduates of the Royal Military College, Sandhurst
John Goschen, 3rd Viscount Goschen
Ministers in the Macmillan and Douglas-Home governments, 1957–1964
John